Glyphipterix phosphora is a species of sedge moth in the genus Glyphipterix. It was described by Edward Meyrick in 1907. It is found in South Australia.

References

Moths described in 1907
Glyphipterigidae
Moths of Australia